Conimex  is a brand of Asian food, which offers a complete wide range of Indonesian products to prepare Indonesian dishes packed in yellow labeled packages.

The brand is owned by British multinational company Unilever. It is the leading Asian food brand in the Netherlands. Conimex products are exported to more than 20 countries.

References

External links 
 Conimex Official site

Baarn
Unilever brands